So This is Love? is a 1928 silent film directed by Frank Capra.  It was produced by Harry Cohn for Columbia Pictures.

Plot
Jerry McGuire (William Collier Jr.) is a dress designer who is tired of being looked upon as a wimp.  He begins secretly training as a boxer to take on Spike Mullins (Johnnie Walker) and win the affections of store clerk Hilda Jensen (Shirley Mason).

Cast
 Shirley Mason as Hilda Jenson  
 William Collier Jr. as Jerry McGuire  
 Johnnie Walker as Spike Mullins  
 Ernie Adams as Flash Tracy  
 Carl Gerard as Otto  
 William H. Strauss as Maison Katz  
 Jean Laverty as Mary Malone

References

External links

1928 films
American black-and-white films
Columbia Pictures films
1928 comedy films
Films directed by Frank Capra
American silent feature films
Silent American comedy films
1920s American films